Ellison's Orange is an English cultivar of domesticated apple, it is a cross between the famous Cox's Orange Pippin and Cellini, which it resembles at most in looks and taste, but can develop a distinct aniseed flavor in storage. The variety is much more disease resistant than Cox's and therefore easier to cultivate.

This cultivar is named after its developer, C. C. Ellison, a priest from Lincolnshire, United Kingdom, who probably crossed it c. 1904 .

Ellison's is a mid-season apple. Flesh texture is quite soft, and much juicier than Cox's, more resembling the flesh of a pear. Easy to grow, but requires good drainage, since it is highly susceptible to apple canker.

Overall it is considered an English classic apple and according to Orange Pippin it should be placed in the first rank of quality apple. It has earned the Award of Garden Merit of the Royal Horticultural Society, in 1993.

References

National Fruit Collection page
Garden Action
Fennel and Fern

Apple cultivars
British apples